The Absolut-Marine Seaplane is a high-wing single engine seaplane.

Variants
 Seaplane
 Seaplane Twin

Specifications (variant specified)

References

Amphibious aircraft